Bosnia and Herzegovina has participated in the Turkvision Song Contest four times since its debut in . The Bosnian broadcaster, Hayat TV, has been the organiser of the Bosnian entry since its debut in the contest. In 2013, the Bosnian entry, Ters Bosanka, qualified to the grand final, where they finished in sixth place with a score of 187 points.

History

2010s
Bosnia and Herzegovina made their debut in the Turkvision Song Contest at the 2013 contest, in Eskişehir, Turkey. Hayat TV internally selected the band Emir & Frozen Camels to represent them on their debut. On 19 November 2013 it was announced that the band would be singing "Ters Bosanka", the song features Mirza Šoljanin. It was later announced in an interview that they would sing the Turkish version of the song at the contest called "Bosnali Kiz". At the contest Bosnia and Herzegovina performed 5th in the semi final and qualified for the final. In the final they performed fifth again and finished in sixth place with 187 points.

On 10 September 2014 Bosnia and Herzegovina were confirmed again as participating in the contest in Kazan, Tatarstan. On 14 October 2014 Hayat TV confirmed that they had internally selected the singer Mensur Salkić to represent them in Kazan. It was announced on 25 October that Mensur would sing "Šutim" at the contest. In Kazan Bosnia and Herzegovina performed 16th in the final, they qualified for the final thirteenth place with 168 points. In the semi final Bosnia & Herzegovina was shown as having received 171 points which was incorrect, this changed an eleventh-place finish into a tie with Yakutia and Bulgaria. It was decided the day after the semi final that the top 15 countries would qualify for the final. They performed twelfth in the final and finished tenth on a total of 176 points.

Participation overview

Related involvement

Jury members

See also 
 Bosnia and Herzegovina in the Eurovision Song Contest

References 

Turkvision
Countries in the Turkvision Song Contest